Frank Berni (30 October 1903 – 10 July 2000) was an Italian-born British restaurateur, known for the Berni Inn restaurant chain that he founded with his younger brother Aldo Berni.

Career
Frank Berni was born on 30 October 1903 in Bardi, northern Italy. He was the eldest of Louis Berni's three sons.

Louis Berni was the owner of a business called Louis Café in Ebbw Vale, Wales.

Berni finished his education in Italy, and then left for Wales, where his father had a cafe business.

Personal life
In 1942, Berni married Lina Allegri, who was from a Welsh Italian family involved in the cafe business in Llanelli. They had two daughters.

References

1903 births
2000 deaths
People from the Province of Parma
British restaurateurs
Italian emigrants to the United Kingdom
20th-century British businesspeople